The 1915 Copa de Honor Municipalidad de Buenos Aires was the final that decided the champion of the 10th. edition of this National cup of Argentina. In the match, held in Racing Club Stadium in Avellaneda, Racing Club beat Tiro Federal (that played its first final) 2–1, winning its third consecutive Copa de Honor trophy.

Qualified teams 

Note

Overview 

The 1915 edition was contested by 30 clubs, 22 within Buenos Aires Province, and 8 from Liga Rosarina de Football. Playing in a single-elimination tournament, Racing beat Estudiantes de La Plata (5–0 in Avellaneda), Hispano Argentino (3–0 also in Avellaneda), Quilmes (1–0 after extra time). In the Buenos Aires' semifinal, Racing beat San Isidro 1–0 at Estadio G.E.B.A., qualifying to play the semifinal vs the Rosario representatives that had played another elimination stage. In the national semifinal, Racing defeated Central Córdoba (2–0 at GER).

On the other hand, Tiro Federal beat Newell's Old Boys (3–1 at Parque Independencia), Club Gimnasia y Esgrima (R) (3–3 and 3–2, both as visitor) qualifying for the semifinal vs the winner of Buenos Aires zone. In the national semifinal, Tiro Federal beat Boca Juniors (4–0, at GER).

The final was held in Racing Stadium, on October 10, 1915. Racing beat Tiro Federal 2–1, with goals by Alberto Ohaco and Alberto Marcovecchio, winning its third consecutive Copa de Honor trophy.

Match details

References

m
1915 in Argentine football
Football in Avellaneda